Bogor-Ciawi–Sukabumi Toll Road or Bocimi Toll Road is a highway of  toll road link, which is under construction that will connect Bogor Regency, Bogor city, Sukabumi Regency and Sukabumi city in West Java, Indonesia. The  first section of the toll road between Ciawi and Cigombong was inaugurated by Indonesia's President Joko Widodo on 3 December 2018.

Sections
Bocimi Toll Road consists of four sections, including 
Section I- Ciawi-Cigombong , formally opened on 1 December 2018.
Section II-Cigombong-Cibadak , in development
Section III-Cibadak-West Sukabumi , pre-development, and
Section IV- West Sukabumi-East Sukabumi , pre-development.
The toll road section I is expected to be fully operational by 2019. The cost of this toll road is about Rp 7.7 trillion.

History
According to BPJT (Indonesian Toll Road Authority), a Concession Toll Road Agreement (PPJT) was initially signed by consortium PT. Bukaka Teknik Utama (PT Bukaka Teknik Utama 35%, PT. Graha Multitama Sejahtera 32.5%, PT. Karya Perkasa Insani 33.5%).
In 2011, Bakrie group took over the majority shareholder of this toll road segment with PT. Trans Jabar Toll as operator. The composition of the shareholder were Bakrie Toll Road 60%, PT. Marga Sarana Jabar 25%, and PT. Bukaka Teknik Utama 15%.
By the year 2014, MNC group acquired PT Bakrie Toll Road. Unfortunately, the Bocimi Toll Road project was not performed well.
Finally, the progress of this project has been increasing significantly since PT. Waskita Toll Road become the shareholder majority of PT. Trans Jabar Toll in 2015. PT. Waskita Toll Road has 81.64% of shareholder while the rest are PT. Bukaka Mega Investama and PT. Jasa Sarana.

Exits

See also

Trans-Java toll road

References

Buildings and structures in West Java
Toll roads in Java
Transport in West Java
Buildings and structures under construction in Indonesia